Rattazzi is a surname, and may refer to the following people:

 Priscilla Rattazzi, Italian photographer
 Riccardo Rattazzi, Italian theoretical physicist
 Steven Rattazzi, American actor
 John (JP) Rattazzi, Good Vibes American
 Susanna Agnelli Rattazzi (1922–2009), Italian politician (also known as the Countess Rattazzi)
 Urbano Rattazzi (1808–1873), Italian statesman